Filipe Miguel Falardo Casimiro (born 31 October 1983), known as Falardo, is a Portuguese retired footballer who played as a midfielder.

Club career
Born in Vila Franca de Xira, Lisbon District, Falardo spent most of his youth career with F.C. Alverca. On 25 April 2004, he played his first and only game in the Primeira Liga, coming on as a 22nd minute substitute in a 0–1 away loss against FC Porto.

Subsequently, Falardo alternated between his country's second and third divisions, also having spells abroad in Romania and Cyprus.

References

External links
 
 
 

1983 births
Living people
People from Vila Franca de Xira
Portuguese footballers
Association football midfielders
Primeira Liga players
Liga Portugal 2 players
Segunda Divisão players
F.C. Alverca players
S.L. Benfica B players
C.D. Olivais e Moscavide players
C.D. Fátima players
Atlético Clube de Portugal players
C.D. Pinhalnovense players
S.C. Farense players
C.D. Cova da Piedade players
Liga I players
FC Gloria Buzău players
Cypriot Second Division players
Digenis Akritas Morphou FC players
Portugal youth international footballers
Portuguese expatriate footballers
Expatriate footballers in Romania
Expatriate footballers in Cyprus
Portuguese expatriate sportspeople in Romania
Portuguese expatriate sportspeople in Cyprus
Sportspeople from Lisbon District